Semenkovo is a rural locality (a settlement) and the administrative center of Semenkovskoye Rural Settlement, Vologodsky District, Vologda Oblast, Russia. The population was 1,233 as of 2002. There are 16 streets.

Geography 
Barachevo is the nearest rural locality.

References 

Rural localities in Vologodsky District